The Society of Hellman Fellows is an endowed program at the University of California campuses which offers research funding and early career fellowships to assistant professors who have ability for great distinction in their fields. The society was established in 1995 by Chris and Warren Hellman and has provided funding to more than 1,900 people.

Notable recipients
Sara Wallace Goodman
Marc Garellek
Amir AghaKouchak
Safiya Noble

References

External links
Official website

University of California
Fellowships
Learned societies of the United States